Perry Alphonso Riley Jr. (born May 3, 1988) is a former American football linebacker. He was drafted by the Washington Redskins in the fourth round of the 2010 NFL Draft. He played college football at LSU.

Early years
Riley attended Stephenson High School in Stone Mountain, Georgia, where he, besides occasionally lining up at running back and strong safety, was part of a highly talented linebacker corps with teammates Kelvin Sheppard, Marcus Ball and Jermaine Cunningham. In his junior year, he registered 96 tackles, eight sacks and five forced fumbles. As a senior, Riley recorded 131 tackles, four interceptions, two sacks, five tackles for loss, and one defensive touchdown.

Regarded as a three-star recruit by Rivals.com, Riley was listed as the No. 27 outside linebackers prospect in the nation. He chose LSU over Tennessee, among others.

College career
In his true freshman year at LSU, Riley saw action in seven games and was credited with four tackles. As a sophomore, he played all 14 season games for the Tigers and tallied 24 tackles, including 1.5 for losses and a half quarterback sack. Riley recorded two solo tackles in the 2008 BCS National Championship Game versus Ohio State.

A starter in his junior year for the Tigers, Riley ranked among the team leaders in total tackles with 60, including 7.0 for losses and 1.5 sacks. He was also credited with an interception, three pass breakups, and three quarterback hurries. Riley was named Defensive MVP of the 2008 Chick-fil-A Bowl and a finalist for the 2008 Butkus Award.

Professional career

Washington Redskins

2010 season
Riley was selected by the Washington Redskins in the fourth round (103rd overall) of the 2010 NFL Draft. He was signed to a contract on June 18, 2010. He was inactive most of the 2010 season. He played very well during times that he was on the field, but also made costly penalties, most notably he committed a 15-yard block in the back penalty against the Minnesota Vikings, nullifying Brandon Banks' punt return touchdown that would have won the game.

2011 season
In the 2011 season, Riley would have his first career start in Week 10 against the Miami Dolphins. He would continue being the starting right inside linebacker in place of Rocky McIntosh. In Week 16 against the Minnesota Vikings, Riley recorded his first career sack. Riley finished the season playing all 16 games, starting eight of them, and recording 68 combined tackles, one sack, and four pass breakups.

2012 season
Riley maintained his starting position at the right inside linebacker position by the start of the 2012 season. In Week 2 against the St. Louis Rams, he recorded his first career forced fumble from wide receiver Danny Amendola, which was recovered by Josh Wilson and returned 30 yards for a touchdown.

2013 season
Riley continued to start at the "Ted" inside linebacker position at the start of the 2013 season. He recorded his first career interception on Kansas City Chiefs backup quarterback Chase Daniel in a Week 14 loss. Long-time defensive captain, London Fletcher, personally supported that the Redskins re-sign Riley after the season when Riley would become a free agent. During Fletcher's retirement announcement, he announced his confidence in Riley's abilities and stated "But as this season has gone, I really wanted to help Perry Riley develop a little bit more. I think he’s at that point where Perry doesn’t need me anymore. He’s that player that I know he can be."

2014 season
Riley was set to become a free agent in 2014, and it was announced on the day before free agency began that Riley had re-signed with the Redskins to a three-year, $13 million contract.

2016 season
He was released by the Redskins on August 30, 2016.

Oakland Raiders
On October 4, 2016, Riley was signed by the Oakland Raiders.
Riley started all 11 games he played for the Raiders, compiling 38 tackles and 10 assists.

References

External links
Washington Redskins bio
LSU Tigers football bio

1988 births
Living people
Players of American football from Atlanta
American football linebackers
LSU Tigers football players
Washington Redskins players
Oakland Raiders players